Agonidium rufoaeneum is a species of ground beetle in the subfamily Platyninae. It was described by Reiche in 1847.

References

rufoaeneum
Beetles described in 1847